Gordon Francis Holz (May 24, 1933 – August 15, 2015) was a professional American football defensive tackle and offensive tackle in the American Football League. He played five seasons for the AFL's Denver Broncos and the New York Jets.

See also
 List of American Football League players

References

1933 births
2015 deaths
Players of American football from Saint Paul, Minnesota
American football defensive tackles
American football offensive tackles
Minnesota Golden Gophers football players
Denver Broncos (AFL) players
New York Jets players
American Football League players